Awanish Kumar Awasthi (born 19 August 1962) is a retired Indian Administrative Service officer of Uttar Pradesh cadre, from the 1987 batch. He served as Additional Chief Secretary to Government of Uttar Pradesh before his superannuation.He is currently serving as Advisor to Chief Minister of Uttar Pradesh

Early life and education
Awanish Kumar Awasthi was born on 19 August 1962. He received his B.Tech. degree in electrical engineering in 1985 from IIT Kanpur. After his graduation he passed the Civil Services Examination in 1987 and became an IAS officer.

Career
Awasthi has worked at the Uttar Pradesh government in multiple roles including being the District Magistrate of Lalitpur, Badaun, Azamgarh, Varanasi, Faizabad, Meerut and Gorakhpur. He held the position of Chairman and Managing Director of Uttar Pradesh Power Corporation Limited (UPPCL) from September 2005 to January 2009. He retired as Additional Chief Secretary in the Government of Uttar Pradesh, in charge of several portfolios, such as Home and Confidential, Religious Affairs and Information. He was seen as CM Yogi Adityanath's "right-hand man".

Personal life
Awanish Kumar Awasthi is married to Indian folk singer and Padma Shri (2016) awardee Malini Awasthi. They have a son Adwitiya and a daughter Ananya.

References

Living people
Indian Administrative Service officers
Indian government officials
People from Kanpur Nagar district
1962 births